Siskin is a name applied to several bird species.

Siskin may also refer to:

Music
 Siskin (band), a UK indie-pop band
 Skew Siskin, a German hard rock band
 Skew Siskin (album)

Sport
 Siskins, a Canadian aerobatic flying team
 Stayner Siskins, a Canadian junior ice hockey team
 Waterloo Siskins, a Canadian junior ice hockey team
 Siskin (horse), a Thoroughbred racehorse

Other uses
 Siskin Children's Institute, a non-profit educational organization in Tennessee, US
 USS Siskin (AMS-58), US naval ship
 Armstrong Whitworth Siskin, a British aircraft